Novosphingobium nitrogenifigens  is a Gram-negative, diazotroph and rod-shaped bacterium from the genus Novosphingobium which has been isolated from pulp and paper wastewater in New Zealand.

References

External links 
Type strain of Novosphingobium nitrogenifigens at BacDive -  the Bacterial Diversity Metadatabase

Bacteria described in 2007
Sphingomonadales